Patissa fulvosparsa is a moth in the family Crambidae. It was described by Arthur Gardiner Butler in 1881. It is found in China (Shandong, Jiangxi, Guangdong, Hainan, Yunnan), Taiwan, Japan, Korea, India and Indonesia.

The wingspan is about 25 mm.

References

Moths described in 1881
Schoenobiinae